Foggo is a town in Bauchi State, northern Nigeria some 150 km south-east of Kano, and about 40 km southwest of Azare.

Geography 
Foggo sits on the east bank of the Bunga River and is located 7 km southwest of Faggo. Foggo has an estimated population of 18,799.

References 

Populated places in Bauchi State